The women's 10,000 metres event featured at the 1991 World Championships in Tokyo, Japan. There were a total of 49 participating athletes, with two qualifying heats and the final being held on 30 August 1991.

Medalists

Schedule
All times are Japan Standard Time (UTC+9)

Final

Qualifying heats
Held on Tuesday 1991-08-27

See also
 1988 Women's Olympic 10.000 metres (Seoul)
 1990 Women's European Championships 10.000 metres (Split)
 1992 Women's Olympic 10.000 metres (Barcelona)

References
 Results
 results

 
10,000 metres at the World Athletics Championships
1991 in women's athletics